The Skelmorlie Aisle of Largs Old Kirk is the remains of a church in the town of Largs, Ayrshire, Scotland.

History
The majority of the kirk (church) was demolished in 1802 when the new parish church came into use, but the aisle, a division of the once  larger building containing the mausoleum, was retained.

The Montgomerie tomb

The Skelmorlie Aisle contains a notable monument built by a local landowner, Sir Robert Montgomerie of Skelmorlie Castle, seventh Laird of Skelmorlie, as a burial site for himself and his wife, Dame Margaret Douglas. The aisle was added to the old kirk (church) of Largs in 1636, and comprises a Renaissance canopied tomb above the burial-vault entrance. The barrel vaulted ceiling of the aisle was painted 1638 in panels, with heraldic emblems and signs of the Zodiac, etc. by a Mr. Stalker. A third coffin within the tomb is said to be that of Sir Hugh Montgomerie of Eaglesham, a hero of the Battle of Otterburn. It can be compared with other significant tombs, such as that of the Cunninghames, Earls of Glencairn at Kilmaurs in East Ayrshire.

Sir Robert's coffin is especially long and much of the lead on the bottom of the coffin is missing, supposedly taken by local fishermen who believed that lead weights made from it would result in a large catch of fish.

Painted ceiling
The painted timber ceiling is signed and dated 1638 by J. Stalker and is in vernacular contrast, albeit the designs are derived from the work of a goldsmith at the French royal court, Etienne Delaune. Lively scenes illustrate the seasons as well as the Montgomerie and Douglas conjoined coat of arms, oddly with the quarters of the Montgomerie arms incorrectly placed as in the Polnoon example. The arms in the panel above the entrance door also have this 'mirror image' arrangement. James Stalker was a former apprentice of an Edinburgh painter, John Sawers. His work seems to be otherwise unrecorded.

Access

Today Skelmorlie Aisle is in the care of Historic Environment Scotland. Admission is free, although visitors need to obtain the key from the adjoining Largs Museum. Both the kirkyard and museum are open from late May to early September from 2.00pm to 5.00pm.

See also
 Brisbane Aisle
 The Queensberry Aisle
 Glencairn Aisle
 Skelmorlie Castle

References

Notes

Sources
 Clan Montgomery Society of North America. 1983 Tour of Scotland.
 Campbell, Thorbjørn (2003). Ayrshire. A Historical Guide. Edinburgh : Birlinn. .

Further reading

External links

Commentary and video on the Skelmorlie Aisle and the history of the Montgomerie family
The Murder of Alexander Cunninghame and Cunninghame of Clonherb by Sir Robert Montgomerie
Video and commentary on the Queensberry Aisle and Douglas Vault, Durisdeer

Buildings and structures completed in 1636
Religious buildings and structures completed in 1636
Historic Scotland properties in North Ayrshire
Category A listed buildings in North Ayrshire
1636 establishments in Scotland